Coleophora irinae is a moth of the family Coleophoridae.

References

irinae
Moths described in 2002